, more commonly referred to as simply Battlarts was a professional wrestling promotion based in Koshigaya, Saitama, Japan. The promotion was formed in 1996 by Japanese wrestler Yuki Ishikawa and featured all of the wrestlers from the Fujiwara Gumi promotion, who had abandoned the promotion in favor of Battlarts. They ran shows in the Tokyo area regularly from 1998 to 2002.

Even though Battlarts' style was based on shoot wrestling, the promotion often cooperated with other federations and styles, including RINGS, Kingdom, Michinoku Pro and Big Japan Pro Wrestling, therefore matches sometimes resembled more traditional pro wrestling matches. The biggest co-promotion occurred on October 17, 1999 when Battlarts and The Great Sasuke's Michinoku Pro Wrestling presented "Michinoku Pro vs. Battlarts", which was headlined by a tag match pitting the owners of both promotions (Great Sasuke and Ishikawa) against Jinsei Shinzaki and Alexander Otsuka.

The promotion ceased running regular shows and events in 2001 due to "management aggravation". Battlarts eventually began to run monthly shows mainly in Tokyo, Saitama, and Shizuoka Prefecture, often co-promoting with Daisuke Ikeda's Fu-ten, Kiyoshi Tamura's STYLE-E and Satoru Sayama's Real Japan Pro Wrestling promotions. On September 14, 2008 at a press conference with Yuki Ishikawa and Shinjiro Otani Battlarts announced a working agreement with Pro Wrestling ZERO1.

It was revealed in late December 2010 that Battlarts would be closing their doors sometime in 2011. The promotion held its final event on November 5, 2011.

Alumni

Alexander Otsuka
Bob Backlund
Carl Malenko (also known as Carl Greco)
Daisuke Ikeda
Dieusel Berto 
Hayato Fujita
Ikuto Hidaka
Johnny GeoBasco
Shannon Ritch
Joe Malenko
Junji Tanaka
Katsumi Usuda
Keita Yano
Manabu Hara
Masaaki Mochizuki
Masao Orihara
Minoru Fujita

Minoru Tanaka
Muhammad Yone
Munenori Sawa
Road Warrior Animal
Road Warrior Hawk
Ryuichi Kawakami
Ryuji Hijikata
Shoichi Funaki
Super Tiger II
Taka Michinoku
Takeshi Ono
Tiger Shark
The Willow
Viktor Krüger
Yuki Ishikawa
Yuta Yoshikawa
Turtle Kamen

Championships and tournaments

Annual Battlarts Young Generation Battle League

See also

Professional wrestling in Japan
List of professional wrestling promotions in Japan

References

External links
 Kakuto Tantei-dan Batoratsu Official Japanese Website
 Battlarts Japanese News Site
 Battlarts B-Blog
 Bati Bati Cafe

Japanese professional wrestling promotions
1996 establishments in Japan
2011 disestablishments in Japan
Recurring sporting events established in 1996
Recurring events disestablished in 2011
Battlarts